Augustus the Elder, Duke of Brunswick-Lüneburg (18 November 1568 – 1 October 1636) was the Lutheran Bishop of Ratzeburg from 1610 to 1636 and the Prince of Lüneburg from 1633 to 1636.

Life 
Augustus was born in 1564 as the fifth of fifteen children and the son of William the Younger and his wife Dorothea of Denmark. As a young man he was a colonel in the service of Rudolf II and fought in the campaigns against France and Turkey. In 1610 Augustus became the Lutheran administrator of the Prince-Bishopric of Ratzeburg.

In order to prevent hereditary aspirations the Ratzeburg cathedral chapter, the elective body, insisted that on ascending to power in the prince-bishopric (an elective monarchy), Augustus committed himself in his election capitulation not to marry. Nevertheless he lived with Ilse Schmidtchen, a commoner, in a 'marriage-like relationship' and had 12 children by her; he built her a house near his residence, Celle Castle. The children were later elevated to the hereditary peerage under the name von Lüneburg; this surname still exists.

In 1633 Augustus succeeded his brother, Christian, who had died, as Prince of Lüneburg. During the Thirty Years War he continued the policy of neutrality started by his brother. He died in Celle in 1636.

Since 1831, the family descended from Augustus has resided at Essenrode Manor. The last male heir (who died in 1961) of this von Lüneburg morganatic line adopted his great-nephew, Baron Ernst Bussche, heir of Essenrode Manor, who took on the name von Lüneburg.

Ancestors

See also 

 House of Welf

References

Sources 
 Geckler, Christa (1986). Die Celler Herzöge: Leben und Wirken 1371–1705. Celle: Georg Ströher. . .

External links
Die House of Welf

Princes of Lüneburg
17th-century Lutheran bishops
1568 births
1636 deaths
Lutheran Prince-Bishops of Ratzeburg
Middle House of Lüneburg
New House of Lüneburg